Thomas John I'Anson Bromwich  (8 February 1875 – 24 August 1929) was an English mathematician, and a Fellow of the Royal Society.

Life
Thomas John I'Anson Bromwich was born on 8 February 1875, in Wolverhampton, England.  He was descended from Bryan I'Anson, of Ashby St Ledgers, Sheriff of London and father of the 17th century 1st Baronet Sir Bryan I'Anson of Bassetsbury.

His parents emigrated to South Africa, where in 1892 he graduated from high school.  He attended St John's College, Cambridge, where in 1895 he became Senior Wrangler. In 1897, he became a lecturer at St. John’s. From 1902 to 1907, he was a professor of mathematics at Queen’s College, Galway.  In 1906, he was elected a Fellow of the Royal Society.  In 1907, he returned to Cambridge and again became a Fellow and lecturer at St. John’s. He was a vice president of the Royal Society in 1919 and 1920. He died in Northampton on 24 August 1929, a suicide.

Work
Bromwich worked in both algebra and analysis.  G. H. Hardy called him "The best pure mathematician among the applied mathematicians at Cambridge, and the best applied mathematician among the pure mathematicians".

Today, Bromwich is perhaps best known for justifying Oliver Heaviside's operator calculus.  
Part of this involved using a contour integral to do an inverse Laplace transform.  This particular contour integral is now often called the Bromwich integral, although it is also called by other names.

Other topics Bromwich investigated include solutions of the Maxwell's equations, and the scattering of  electromagnetic plane waves by spheres. He also investigated, and wrote a book on, the theory of quadratic forms.

In 1906 he derived Bromwich inequality in the field of matrices which gives narrower bounds to characteristic roots than those given by Bendixson's inequality.

In 1908 he wrote An introduction to the theory of infinite series. A second edition appeared in 1926. G. H. Hardy praised the book highly, while criticizing the way in which it was laid out. The book is still in print.

Notes

External links
 

Fellows of the Royal Society
Alumni of St John's College, Cambridge
Fellows of St John's College, Cambridge
20th-century English mathematicians
People from Wolverhampton
Senior Wranglers
1875 births
1929 deaths
Suicides in England
1929 suicides